Kariobangi Sharks Football Club, commonly known as Sharks or K. Sharks is a Kenyan football club based in Nairobi and founded in the slums of Kariobangi on the east side of Nairobi City County. The team plays in the KPL, the top tier of the Football Kenya Federation system. The Sharks' traditional colors are yellow and green with either kit being worn with socks of the same color.

History
Kariobangi Sharks was founded in the year 2000 and started in the lower divisions of the Nairobi league. The Kariobangi area was then an infamous crime hot spot in the city and sports, especially football which was the most famous one, was one of the escape routes for the youth trapped in the dangerous hustle and bustle.

A set of young footballers used to play at the Holy Trinity Catholic Church, Kariobangi mostly after school going hours and during the weekends as a leisure activity. Their field was the church’s basketball court made of concrete slab. The boys didn’t have a coach or a captain and mostly played using worn-out balls usually mended by cobblers or at times they also used the lifundo, African name to the balls made by plastic bags and ropes.

A young man by the name Nick Mwendwa, who lived just across the church would occasionally watch the boys play through the window of his house and he couldn’t help but notice the talent there but he was also disturbed by how disorganized the boys looked as they would always argue and at times even prematurely end the game and go home angry.

Mwendwa then decided to come and offer the boys some guidance and assistance. He would dig into his savings and buy the boys three brand new balls from the Nairobi Sports House. He then started training them every weekend when he wasn’t going to work. They adopted the name Kariobangi Sharks FC. The founder Nick Mwendwa doubled up as team coach and manager.

Most of the boys played barefoot since they lacked playing shoes while other used worn out sport shoes. At that time due to lack of training kits, training session teams were distinguished by one team taking off their shirts and the other playing with their shirts on.

After a year of playing in local tournaments, Nick Mwendwa finally registered the team in the Kenya Football Federation at around February 2001 making them eligible of playing in the lowest tier at the country starting with Nairobi Province League. With the little savings from his earning, Mwendwa would cater for the team transport to honor league matches. At times when it wasn’t enough the young boys would pool together fare for one way while Mwendwa would pay for the other way. They used the popular public transport known as matatu in Nairobi.

Top performances at the Nairobi League then earned the team promotion to the Division II which was the lowest national football tier. In 2011 the club was promoted to the KFF nationwide league just before the Unified elections and subsequently played in the unified Division I league then joining the newly formed National Super league in 2013.

In the final match of the 2015- 2016 National Super League (NSL) season, Kariobangi sharks beat Nzoia United to secure the team’s promotion to the KPL. Lone goal from Patillah Omotto, a sharks homegrown player and captain guaranteed Kariobangi sharks a berth in the 2017 Kenya premier league

In 2017, the team reached the Federation Cup final for the very first time in what was also the first season at the top tier league but lost 2-0 to AFC Leopards. The team would however finish an impressive 3rd place in the league, marking a wonderful debut season at the Kenyan Premier League.

That year also saw the team produce the league Top Scorer, Masud Juma (17 goals) and the league Top goalkeeper John Oyemba who kept 16 clean sheets, more than any other keeper. Coach William “Kanu” Muluhya was also voted the coach of the year. Midfielder Sven Yidah was also nominated among the league’s New Player of the Year.

In 2018 the team won their first major trophy as they returned to the Federation Cup final again beating Sofapaka FC 3-2 with a brace from Ugandan striker George Abege and a goal from Sydney Lokale. In that same year Sharks produced the league’s Most Valuable Player in Erick Kapaito. The striker won the League Top Scorer and the New Player of the year and was also 2nd in the league Fair Play award of the season as he was never booked the entire season. The team finished 6th in the league.

In the 2018/19 season the team played in the CAF Confederation Cup Qualifiers for the very 1st time. The team beat Djibouti’s Arta Solar FC in the 1st round before being eliminated by Ghana’s Asante Kotoko in the second round. The team got to the Cup final for the 3rd season in a row but this time lost 3-1 to Bandari FC and finished the league on position 8.

The team trains at Utalii College where the management has signed a memorandum of understanding with the school to allow them to use the grounds while upgrading the facilities.

References

Kenyan National Super League clubs
FKF Division One clubs
Football clubs in Kenya